June Gruber is a licensed clinical psychologist whose research focuses on the positive affectivity and disturbances involving positive emotion, for example, as experienced by people with bipolar disorder. She is an Associate Professor of Psychology and Neuroscience at the University of Colorado Boulder and Director of the Positive Emotion and Psychopathology Laboratory (www.gruberpeplab.com).

Gruber received the Association for Psychological Science (APS) Rising Star Award in 2011. and APS Janet Taylor Spence Award for Transformative Early Career Contributions in 2016.

Gruber is editor of the Oxford Handbook of Positive Emotion and Psychopathology  and co-editor (with Judith Tedlie Moskowitz) of Positive Emotion: Integrating the Light Sides and Dark Sides.

Early life and education
Gruber was raised in Half Moon Bay, California, where she attended Half Moon Bay High School and graduated as class co-valedictorian in 1999. She later attended the University of California, Berkeley, where she completed her B.A. in Psychology with the highest distinction in scholarship and high honors in psychology (2003) and was a Haas Undergraduate Research Fellow.

Academic career
Gruber earned her M.A. (2005) and Ph.D. (2009) in Clinical Psychology, also at UC Berkeley, where she was an NIMH Predoctoral Fellow in Affective Science. As a student of affective and clinical science, Gruber collaborated on projects with Ann Kring, Sheri Johnson, and Dacher Keltner. Her dissertation was supervised by Allison Harvey.

Gruber was an Assistant Professor of Psychology at Yale University from 2009-2014. Whilst there she received the Arthur Greer Memorial Prize for Outstanding Junior Faculty to support her research on the potentially negative consequences of positive emotion.

In 2014 she moved to the University of Colorado Boulder.

Research areas

Negative impacts of positive emotions: Psychopathology and bipolar disorder
Gruber conducts research on the ways different types of positive emotions impact well-being and health, and particularly on negative aspects. Positive emotions may provide the basis for dysfunction, and suboptimal outcomes. This area of work is sometimes known as "positive emotion disturbance".

During her graduate studies in clinical psychology Dr. Gruber gained first-hand exposure to patients diagnosed with bipolar disorder, and saw the potential negative consequences of heightened euphoria during mania.

Happiness
Gruber sees happiness as "not one single thing," but composed of "feelings, thoughts, behaviors and even the way our body responds."  She believes a direct focus on achieving happiness can backfire; "people report feeling less happy the more they try to pursue it." So her advice is “Don’t focus on the pursuit of happiness; focus on other people, things you’re grateful for and doing things for others as opposed [for] yourself.”

Gruber has undertaken studies suggesting that seeking happiness can have negative effects, such as failure to meet over-high expectations. (Iris Mauss has similarly shown that the more people strive for happiness, the more likely they’ll set up too high of standards and feel disappointed.)

Gruber has argued that happiness may have negative effects. It may trigger a person to be more sensitive, more gullible, less successful, and more likely to undertake high risk behaviours.

Recognitions and Awards

Gruber's work has been recognized by several early-career awards including the 2011 Association for Psychological Science’s Rising Star Award and the 2016 Association for Psychological Science’s Janet Taylor Spence Award for Transformative Early Career Contributions, the 2012 Society for Research in Psychopathology's Early Career Award, and two NARSAD Young Investigator Awards in 2014 and 2019 from the Brain & Behavior Research Foundation.

Other activities

Gruber has taught courses on emotion, happiness, and psychopathology. Her pedagogical activities also include the forthcoming #TalkMentalIllness series, the Experts in Emotion Interview Series at Yale University, and a free online course in Human Emotion available through YouTube and iTunes U. Gruber offers a free online course in Human Emotion available through YouTube and other sources. She has given a public TEDx talk on the “dark side” of happiness. She contributes to a monthly column for young scientists on careers in Science. 
Gruber is engaged in science outreach and distribution of the science of emotions and mental health for students and the broader public. 
She developed a focus on the mental health crisis sparked by the COVID-19 pandemic.

Gruber is invested in mentoring future generations of scientists and clinicians, and co-writes a monthly column for young scientists in Science Careers, is the recipient of the 2020 UROP Outstanding Faculty Mentor Award, and received an IMPART grant to co-lead a workshop on advancing underrepresented women in the sciences. She has also written on the role of women in psychological research.

References

External links 

 Faculty Homepage
Positive Emotion and Psychopathology lab at UC Boulder

American women psychologists
Bipolar disorder researchers
Emotion psychologists
University of California, Berkeley alumni
University of Colorado Boulder faculty
Living people
Year of birth missing (living people)
21st-century American women
American clinical psychologists